The Lunada Bay Boys or simply the Bay Boys, are a surfer gang in Palos Verdes Estates, California, known for their aggressive localism. In 2016, Newsweek called the Lunada Bay Boys "America's most notorious surf gang". The group's territorialism of the Lunada Bay public beach has caused controversy in the legal and surfing worlds. Although the Bay Boys are now often considered a gang, the group had non-violent beginnings in the 1960s as a self-described surfing "family" or fraternity.

History
Historically, Lunada Bay had been considered an acclaimed big wave winter surf spot, with a right-hand break. The culture of Palos Verdes surfing clubs extends back as far as the 1930s with groups such as the Palos Verdes Surfing Club.

The Lunada Bay Boys started in the 1960s as a fraternity of local surfers in the Palos Verdes region. An anonymous member stated, "It was more like a big family. I wouldn’t call it a gang. We used to camp down there every other night. We would almost live down there." The group wasn't known for its localism during the 1960s, and surfers within the group were not as prone to violence. At the time, the Lunada Bay Boys wasn't the only surf crew in the city and neighbored the "Portuguese Bend crew" (Portuguese Bend Club) as well as the "Haggerty's crew" (Haggerty's Surfing Club) of their respective surf spots.

Around this time, localism of surf spots was considered common sense due to outside surfers often causing boards to fall in the rocks due to lack of leashes at the time. Big wave surfing pioneer Greg Noll, as well as U.S. champion Mike Purpus of Redondo Beach, would surf with the Bay Boys in Lunada Bay during this era. The acclaim of Lunada Bay as a surf spot led to the creation of Lunada Bay Wetsuits in the late '60s. Mike Purpus and surfers Dewey Weber, Collie Ragland, Don Craig, and Donald Takayama would model for these Lunada Bay Wetsuits ads. Around this time, members would hang out on a rock ledge, however in the late 60s, a stone balcony was created on the shoreline of Lunada Bay, as a hangout for local surfers (often referred to as their "fort"). The "fort" was destroyed by State of California employees in 2016 partly in response to a lawsuit directed against the Bay Boys organization. 

In the 1970s, a leadership shift happened in which older members moved away, and newer members surfaced into leadership. Older members of the group were stated to have "kept it safe and sane", whereas the newer leadership began to hassle outsiders more directly. A surfer at Lunada Bay expressed that the reason violence escalated in years after was because the younger generation sought to show devotion to the territory in the presence of veteran members.

Culture
In the 1960s, the Lunada Bay Boys culture was mostly nonviolent and held close alliances with the neighboring Redondo Beach and Hermosa Beach. Activities of the original generation included camping down at the beach, fishing, diving, or shaping their surf boards in their shops. Becoming a member of the group was more relaxed and involved no more than to be a local.

One local told Stab magazine that approximately one quarter to one half of local surfers in Lunada Bay are members of the Lunada Bay Boys.

Common acts of localism include hassling people, intimidation, vandalizing vehicles, slashing tires, throwing rocks, and inciting violence against non-locals. A surfer at Lunada Bay expressed his feelings on localism stating, "If we let every nice guy surf, there’d be a hundred guys out here. You have to nip it in the bud. The reason it’s not crowded is that people protect it. It’s fucked, dude. People think we’re a bunch of assholes, but you know what? We want to keep it like this so we can go somewhere where it’s fucking sacred."

Legality and lawsuits
The Palos Verdes Estates Police Department has been criticized for not taking effective legal action against the Lunada Bay Boys, with the LA Times reporting that "city leaders repeatedly downplayed the alleged harassment by the Bay Boys against other surfers at Lunada Bay". Palos Verdes Estates Police Chief Jeff Kepley has acknowledged that officers in his department "may have relationships with surfers accused of tormenting outsiders."

In March 2016, surfer Diana Milena Reed and her lawyer sought an injunction against alleged members of the Lunada Bay Boys, to keep them from surfing at Lunada Bay. This lawsuit included claims of sexual harassment. The defendants denied Reed's allegations. Defendant Frank Ponce stated the claims were "ridiculous" and that "there are no Bay Boys".

In popular culture
A fictional representation of the Bay Boys is prominently featured in the book (and film), The Tribes of Palos Verdes.

See also
Malibu Locals Only

References

Further reading
 They broke a schoolteacher's ribs and pelvis – for daring to surf on
 California's surf wars: wave 'warlords' go to extreme lengths to defend their turf

Street gangs
Gangs in California
Surf culture